The 1947–48 New York Knicks season was the second season for the team in the Basketball Association of America (BAA), which later merged with the National Basketball League to become the National Basketball Association. The Knicks finished in second place in the Eastern Division with a 26–22 record and qualified for the BAA Playoffs. In the first round, New York was eliminated by the Baltimore Bullets in a best-of-three series, two games to one. Carl Braun was the team's scoring leader during the season. 

At the 1947 BAA draft, the Knicks selected Dick Holub in the first round, with the fifth overall pick. The Knicks also selected Wataru Misaka, who made the team's final roster and became "the first person of color to play in modern professional basketball", just months after the Major League Baseball color line had been broken by the Brooklyn Dodgers' Jackie Robinson. Misaka was cut after playing only three games with the team. The 1947–48 season was the first as New York's head coach for Joe Lapchick, who had previously held the same position for college basketball's St. John's; he had been hired in March 1947. The Knicks had a 13–13 record in the first 26 games of the season before going on an eight-game winning streak from January 28 to February 11. However, New York won only four of its final 12 regular season contests.

In game one of the first round of the playoffs, held in Baltimore, the Bullets defeated the Knicks 85–81 behind a 34-point performance by Connie Simmons. The Knicks evened the series at one victory apiece by winning the second game 79–69 in New York, as four players scored more than 10 points. The win forced a decisive third game back in Baltimore, which the Knicks lost 84–77. Simmons led the Bullets with 22 points, while Chick Reiser added 21. The Bullets went on to win the 1948 BAA Finals.

Draft

Roster

Regular season

Season standings

Record vs. opponents

Game log

Playoffs

|- align="center" bgcolor="#ffcccc"
| 1
| March 27
| @ Baltimore
| L 81–85
| Bud Palmer (21)
| Baltimore Coliseum
| 0–1
|- align="center" bgcolor="#ccffcc"
| 2
| March 28
| Baltimore
| W 79–69
| Bud Palmer (18)
| Madison Square Garden III
| 1–1
|- align="center" bgcolor="#ffcccc"
| 3
| April 1
| @ Baltimore
| L 77–84
| Sid Tanenbaum (18)
| Baltimore Coliseum
| 1–2
|-

Awards and records
Carl Braun, All-BAA Second Team

Transactions

Free agency

Additions

Subtractions

References

New York Knicks seasons
New York
New York Knicks
New York Knicks
1940s in Manhattan
Madison Square Garden